Subrius Flavus was a tribune of the Praetorian Guard who was heavily implicated in the Pisonian conspiracy against the Emperor Nero and was executed in 65 CE for his involvement.

Role in the Pisonian Conspiracy

As Tribune and a man of military experience, Flavus enjoyed great significance in the plot. Along several others, including the Centurion Sulpicius Asper, Flavus is described as one of the conspiracy's "leading lights" by Tacitus. He was close to Gaius Calpurnius Piso, the figurehead of the conspiracy.

Tacitus observes that Flavus' hatred for Nero arose suddenly while he was watching him perform on stage but failed to attack him in front of the audience because he would not have had a chance to escape. 

Tacitus also observes that it was rumoured that, after the success of the conspiracy, Flavus intended to murder Piso and give control over the empire to Seneca the Younger, a fellow conspirator, because "it mattered not as to the disgrace if a harp-player were removed and a tragic actor succeeded him." For as Nero used to sing to the harp, so did Piso in the dress of a tragedian".

Depiction in Tacitus

Flavus, like Seneca the Younger, is presented as a bastion of traditional morality by Tacitus, as in the above quote, because of his stand against Nero's excesses. The Classicist Edward Champlin argues that Flavus is one of the few figures in the Annals whom Tacitus eulogises without reserve.

Execution
Because of his involvement in the conspiracy, Flavus was condemned to death. He was beheaded in two strokes in front of a pre-dug pit near the Castra Praetoria in 65 CE. The execution was entrusted to a tribune, Veianius Niger.

References

1st-century Romans
People executed by the Roman Empire
65 deaths
Members of the Pisonian conspiracy
People executed by decapitation
Year of birth unknown